The Men's Macau Open 2016 is the men's edition of the 2016 Macau Open, which is a tournament of the PSA World Tour event International (Prize money: $50,000). The event will take place in Macau in China from 15 September to 18 September.

Prize money and ranking points
For 2016, the prize purse was $ 50,000. The prize money and points breakdown was as follows:

Seeds

Draw and results

See also
2016 PSA World Tour
Women's Macau Open 2016
Macau Open (squash)

References

External links
PSA Macau Open 2016 website
Macau Open 2016 squashsite page

Squash tournaments in Macau
Macau Open
Macau Open (squash)